A Bostonian is a person from Boston, Massachusetts, United States, or of Boston, Lincolnshire, England.

Bostonian may also refer to:
 Bostonian (horse), an American racehorse
 The Bostonians, a novel by Henry James 
 The Bostonians (film), a 1984 film by Merchant Ivory Productions
 Boston accent, the dialect of American English spoken by native residents of Boston, Massachusetts
 Bostonian, a dress shoe brand acquired by C. & J. Clark in 1979

See also 
 Boston (disambiguation)